Blooming Blue is the third extended play by South Korean singer Chungha. It was released by MNH Entertainment and distributed by Stone Music Entertainment on July 18, 2018.

Release 
The EP was released on July 18, 2018, through several music portals, including MelOn and iTunes.

Commercial performance 
Blooming Blue debuted and peaked at number 9 on the Gaon Album Chart, on the week of July 21, 2018. In its second week, the EP fell to number 39, and 68 a week later. The EP charted for five consecutive weeks on the chart.

The EP was the 29th best selling-album of July 2018, with 8,826 physical copies sold. The EP has sold over 9,992 copies as of August 2018.

Track listing 
Digital download/CD

Charts

Release history

References 

2018 EPs
Chungha albums
Korean-language EPs